Montsec d'Ares is the central part of the Montsec mountain range, stretching between the cliffs of Montrebei in the West and Terradets in the East.

Location
La Serra del Montsec is located in the Catalan province of Lleida and in the Aragonese province of Huesca in Spain. The mountain "Montsec d'Ares" is perfectly oriented West - East. The highest point is "Santalis." Several villages are located in Montsec d'Ares, including as L'Ametlla del Montsec and Ager in the South side and Sant Esteve de la Sarga in the North.

Mountain ranges of Aragon
Mountain ranges of Catalonia